Lord Layton may refer to:

 Lord Athol Layton (1919–1984), British-Australian boxer-wrestler
 Baron Layton, a British peerage title created in 1947, and held by several successors
 Walter Thomas Layton, 1st Baron Layton (1884–1966), British economist, editor, newspaperman
 Michael Layton, 2nd Baron Layton (1912–1989), British businessman and politician

See also
 Sir Geoffrey Layton (1884–1964), British admiral
 Layton (surname)
 Layton (given name)
 Layton (disambiguation)